Wayne Nicholson is an American biologist. He attended at the University of Wisconsin–Madison and University of Connecticut. He served for the department of microbiology and cell biology and also as the distinguished professor at the University of Florida.

References 

Living people
Place of birth missing (living people)
Year of birth missing (living people)
American biologists
American microbiologists
20th-century American biologists
21st-century American biologists
University of Florida faculty
University of Wisconsin–Madison alumni
University of Connecticut alumni